Octouncuhaptor is a genus of monopisthocotylean monogeneans in the family Ancyrocephalidae.

Species
According to the World Register of Marine Species, there is a single species in the genus:

 Octouncuhaptor eugerrei Mendoza Franco, Roche & Torchin, 2008 
This species is a parasite of the fish Eugerres brasilianus (Gerreidae) from Gatun Lake, Panama Canal Watershed. It has also been mentioned from the fish Eugerres plumieri in Mexico.

References

Ancyrocephalidae
Monogenea genera
Parasites of fish
Fauna of Panama
Fauna of Mexico